The Flying Fleet is a 1929 romantic drama film directed by George W. Hill and starring Ramon Novarro, Ralph Graves, and Anita Page. Two United States Navy officers are rivals for the love of the same woman. The film is silent, and in black and white, although various scenes have either background music, engine noises or in one case, trumpet sounds, inserted.

Plot
Six friends are to graduate the next day from the United States Naval Academy. They all hope to become aviators. When the officer of the day becomes sick, Tommy Winslow has to take his place, while the others go out and celebrate. Two return loudly drunk after curfew. Tommy is able to shut Steve up (by knocking him out), but "Dizzy" is not so lucky. An officer hears him and has him dismissed from the Academy.

The rest spend a year in the fleet, then reunite in San Diego for aviation training. Upon their arrival, they become acquainted with Anita Hastings. Tommy and Steve become rivals for her affections.

Specs is rejected for training because of his bad eyesight. The remaining four then head to training school in Pensacola, Florida. Kewpie panics on his first flight, forcing his instructor to knock him out to regain control of their trainer biplane, while "Tex" loses control during his first solo flight and crashes into the sea. Tommy and Steve pass and are promoted to lieutenant. Upon their return to San Diego, they are reunited with Specs, now an aerial navigator, and Kewpie, the radio officer of the USS Langley, the Navy's first aircraft carrier.

The romantic rivalry between Tommy and Steve takes an ugly turn when it becomes apparent that Anita prefers Tommy. Steve resorts to underhanded tricks, straining his friendship with Tommy. In retaliation for Steve hiding his uniform pants during a swimming outing with Anita, Tommy buzzes Steve on the airfield after a mock aerial dogfight he has won. The admiral is greatly displeased, and deprives Tommy of the honor of piloting a pioneering  flight to Honolulu, awarding it to Steve instead.

Steve takes off, with Specs as his navigator. However, they run into a severe storm and crash into the ocean before the radio operator can report their position. All four of the crew survive and make it to the floating aircraft wing, but Specs is badly injured. The admiral, following in the Langley aircraft carrier, immediately orders an all-out aerial search. As the days go by, Steve and the others save the little fresh water for Specs, despite his protests; finally, while the others are asleep, Specs drags himself into the water and drowns himself. Meanwhile, the admiral is ordered to give up his fruitless search. Tommy pleads with him for one last attempt, and the admiral agrees. Tommy finally spots the survivors, but his engine conks out. He sets his aircraft on fire as a signal to the Langley and parachutes into the water. When they return to San Diego, Anita is waiting for him.

Cast

 Ramon Novarro as Ensign / Lieutenant (j.g.) Tommy Winslow
 Ralph Graves as Ensign / Lieutenant (j.g.) Steve Randall
 Anita Page as Anita Hastings
Uncredited cast listed alphabetically:
 Alfred Allen as Admiral
 Wade Boteler as Shipwrecked crewman
 Bud Geary as Admiral's aide
 Sumner Getchell as Kewpie
 Gardner James as Specs
 Roscoe Karns as Shipwrecked radio operator
 Claire McDowell as Mrs. Hastings, Anita's mother
 Edward J. Nugent as Midshipman "Dizzy"
 Carroll Nye as "Tex"
 The "Three Sea Hawks" as Themselves

Production
The Flying Fleet was made with the cooperation of the United States Navy, with the note appearing in the opening credits: "Dedicated to the officers and men of NAVAL AVIATION whose splendid co-operation made this production possible." The film was the first major Hollywood production to use Naval Air Station North Island.  appears in several scenes. The inclusion of the "Three Sea Hawks" aerobatic team was a highlight of The Flying Fleet. Drawing from VB-2B squadron at Naval Air Station North Island, San Diego, the team used three Boeing F2B-1 and F2B-2 fighters. Its first demonstration in January 1928 at San Francisco gave rise to a popular nickname: "Suicide Trio" although officially the team was called "Three Sea Hawks".

The film was the first from Frank "Spig" Wead whose story was the basis for the screenplay. He went on to write the screenplays of a number of naval and aviation-related films including: Dirigible (1931), Hell Divers (1931), Air Mail (1932), Ceiling Zero (1936), China Clipper (1936), Test Pilot (1938), The Citadel (1938), Dive Bomber (1941), Destroyer (1943), They Were Expendable (1945) and The Beginning or the End (1947).

The teaming of up-and-coming Anita Page and heartthrob Ramon Novarro was considered good box office. Page later recalled that Novarro was "... something to dream about. I mean he was so good looking."

Reception
The New York Times critic Mordaunt Hall wrote that "the story is sometimes quite a bit too melodramatic", but appreciated the "thrilling stunts" and "some splendid sequences devoted to an airplane carrier". Modern reviewer Dennis Schwartz agreed, stating, "the authentic looking plane stunts and test pilot sequences make the film a winner, as the tepid romance story flags."

See also

 List of media set in San Diego

References

Notes

Citations

Bibliography

 Burns, Don. "Biography for Frank Wead." Internet Movie Database. 
 Farmer, James H. "Hollywood Goes to North Island NAS." The Making of the Great Aviation Films, General Aviation Series, Volume 2, 1989.
 "Mr. Wead Comes Out of the Clouds." The New York Times, May 5, 1935.

External links

 
 
 
 

1929 romantic drama films
1929 films
1920s American films
American aviation films
American black-and-white films
American romantic drama films
American silent feature films
Films about the United States Navy
Films directed by George Hill
Metro-Goldwyn-Mayer films
Silent romantic drama films
Silent adventure films
Silent American drama films
Films with screenplays by Richard Schayer
Films set in San Diego
Films set in Florida